"The bush" is a term mostly used in the English vernacular of Australia and New Zealand where it is largely synonymous with backwoods or hinterland, referring to a natural undeveloped area.  The fauna and flora contained within this area must be indigenous to the region, although exotic species will often also be present.

The Australian and New Zealand usage of the word "bush" for "forest" or scrubland, probably comes from the Dutch word "bos/bosch" ("forest"), used by early Dutch settlers in South Africa, where it came to signify uncultivated country among Afrikaners. Many English-speaking early European settlers to South Africa later migrated to Australia or New Zealand and brought the term with them. Today, in South Africa Fynbos tends to refer to the heath vegetation of the Western Cape and Eastern Cape.

It is also widely used in Canada to refer to the large, forested portion of the country. The same usage applies in the US state of Alaska.

History 
Indigenous Australians have lived in remote areas of bush for thousands of years and in turn have 
provided resources for the survival skills, mainly with bush tucker and the spiritual healing of bush medicine. From 1788 onwards, land grants began to develop along with permanent human settlements near vast tracts of bush.

In the period of British colonial rule in Australia, bushrangers were originally escaped convicts and used the bush as a sanctuary to hide from authorities. The era of bushranging came to an end in 1880 when they disappeared completely, with the concluding execution of Ned Kelly.

Since that time, the bush has been the intense scene of frequent seasonal bushfires.

Usage by country

Australia

The concept of "the bush" has become iconic in Australia. In reference to the landscape, "bush" refers to any sparsely-inhabited region, regardless of vegetation. "The bush" in this sense was something that was uniquely Australian and very different from the green European landscapes familiar to many new immigrants. The term "Outback" is also used, but usually in association with the more arid inland areas of Australia. "The bush" also refers to any populated region outside of the major metropolitan areas, including mining and agricultural areas. Consequently, it is not unusual to have a mining town in the desert such as Port Hedland (Pop. 14,000) referred to as "the bush" within the media.

Bush poets such as Henry Lawson (1867-1922) and Banjo Paterson (1864-1942) revered the bush as a source of national ideals, as did contemporaneous painters in the Heidelberg School like Tom Roberts (1856–1931), Arthur Streeton (1867–1943) and Frederick McCubbin (1855–1917). Romanticising the bush in this way was a big step forward for Australians in their steps towards self-identity. The legacy is a folklore rich in the spirit of the bush.

Australians affix the term "bush" to any number of other entities or activities to describe their rural, country or folk nature, e.g. "Bush cricket", "Bush music", "Bush doof".

Settlement in Australia often results in fragmentation of the bush.

New Zealand

 

In New Zealand, Bush primarily refers to areas of native trees rather than exotic forests, however, the word is also used in the Australian sense of anywhere outside urban areas, encompassing grasslands as well as forests.

Areas with bush (i.e. native forest) are found in both the North Island and the South Island, some of it bordering towns and cities, but the majority of bush is found in large national parks. Examples of predominantly bush clad areas are Whanganui National Park, on Taranaki volcano, on which the bush extends in a uniformly circular shape to the surrounding farmland, and Fiordland in the South Island. Much of Stewart Island/Rakiura is bush-covered. In the North Island, the largest areas of bush cover the main ranges stretching north-northeast from Wellington towards East Cape, notably including the Urewera Ranges, and the catchment of the Whanganui River. Significant stands remain in Northland and the ranges running south from the Coromandel Peninsula towards Ruapehu, and isolated remnants cap various volcanoes in Taranaki, the Waikato, the Bay of Plenty and the Hauraki Gulf.

From the word comes many phrases including:
 bush-bash – to make one's way through the forest, rather than on a track or trail (cf. American English "bushwhack[ing]", "bushwack[ing]", or "bush-whack[ing]").
 bush shirt – a woolen shirt or Swanndri, often worn by forest workers.
 bush lawyer – the name of a number of native climbing plants or a layman who expounds on legal matters.
 bush walk – short day walks (hikes) in the bush
 going bush – to live in the bush for an extended period of time, which may include "living off the land" by means of hunting or fishing.
 bushman – Used in the 19th century for New Zealand loggers. The term still stands for someone that lives in the bush as a means of preferable lifestyle.

South Africa
In South Africa, the term has specific connotations of rural areas which are not open veldt. Generally, it refers to areas in the north of the country that would be called savanna. "Going to The Bush" (Bos toe Gaan) often refers to going to a game park or game reserve. Areas most commonly referred to as The Bush are the Mpumalanga and Limpopo Lowveld, The Limpopo River Valley, northern KwaZulu-Natal or any other similar area of wilderness.

Alaska and Canada

The Bush in Alaska is generally described as any community not "on the road system", making it accessible only by more elaborate transportation. Usage is similar in Canada; it is called la brousse or colloquially le bois in Canadian French. In Canada, "the bush" refers to large expanses of forest and swampland which sprawl undeveloped, as well as any forested area.

Related terms

The term "to go bush" has several similar meanings all connected with the supposed wildness of the bush. It can mean to revert to a feral nature (or to "go native"), and it can also mean to deliberately leave normal surroundings and live rough, with connotations of cutting off communication with the outside world – often as a means of evading capture or questioning by the police. The term bushwhacker is used in Australia and New Zealand to mean someone who spends his or her time in the bush.

The verb to bushwhack has two meanings. One is to cut through heavy brush and other vegetation to pass through tangled country: "We had to do quite a bit of bushwhacking today to clear the new trail." The other meaning is to hide in such areas and then attack unsuspecting passers-by: "We were bushwhacked by the bandits as we passed through their territory and they took all of our money and supplies."

The Bushwhackers were also a New Zealand professional wrestling tag team that was inducted into the WWE Hall of Fame class of 2015.

In New Zealand, "The Bush" is a nickname for the Wairarapa Bush provincial rugby team. The team was formed by an amalgamation of two earlier teams, Wairarapa and Bush. The latter team had represented an area on the boundaries of the Wairarapa and Hawke's Bay which was in former times known as Bush due to its dense vegetation cover.

In the United States, minor league baseball, which is typically played in smaller cities, is sometimes derisively called "bush league baseball".

In Australia,"Sydney or the bush" equates with such terms as "Hollywood or bust" to mean staking total success or failure on one high-risk event. This usage appears in several Peanuts cartoons, causing Charlie Brown much confusion.

See also

Backcountry
Black stump
Bush flying
Bush mechanic
Bush medicine
Bush tucker
Bushcraft
Bushland
Bushranger
Deserts of Australia
Old-growth forest
Outback
Wilderness

References

Geography of Alaska
Geography of Australia
Geography of New Zealand
Geography of South Africa
Geography of Canada
Rural geography